Francisco Sosa Wagner (born 15 June 946 in Alhucemas, Spanish Protectorate of Morocco) is a Spanish jurist, professor of administrative law, writer and politician. He was elected at the 2009 European election as a Member of the European Parliament (MEP) for the Union, Progress and Democracy party. He was re-elected in 2014, but resigned his seat in October that year.

References 
The information in this article is based on that in its Spanish equivalent.

1946 births
Living people
Union, Progress and Democracy politicians
Spanish male writers
Spanish jurists
MEPs for Spain 2009–2014
MEPs for Spain 2014–2019